Tanauan City held its local elections on Monday, May 13, 2019, as a part of the 2019 Philippine general election.  The voters will elect candidates for the elective local posts in the city: the mayor, vice mayor, and the 10 members of its city council.

Background 
Jhoanna Corona-Villamor was installed as mayor of Tanauan, following the assassination of then-incumbent Mayor Antonio Halili, who served as City Mayor from 2013 on July 2, 2018 while attending the flag-raising ceremony at the Tanauan City Hall. Halili was the second incumbent local chief executive of Tanauan to be assassinated following former Mayor Cesar Platon who was assassinated in 2001 while campaigning for governor of Batangas. Halili gained public attention because of the walk of shame campaign against criminality and illegal drugs.

Corona-Villamor entered politics in 2010 when she was elected city councilor and as the first female city vice mayor in 2013. She is also the second female local chief executive next to Sonia Torres-Aquino. Instead of running for her first full three-year term, she is seeking a seat in the Batangas Provincial Board representing the 3rd District of Batangas, switching places with her father, former mayor and incumbent 3rd district board member Alfredo Corona.

Corona was a former Kabataang Barangay Chairman, municipal councilor, vice mayor and became the first elected city mayor of Tanauan in 2001 until he was deposed in 2006 following the assumption of Sonia Torres Aquino who was declared by the Commission on Elections and the Supreme Court as the real winner in the 2004 mayoralty race.

Mary Angeline Halili, the daughter of assassinated mayor Antonio Halili is also joining the mayoralty race. She is running under the United Nationalist Alliance.

Mayoralty and Vice Mayoralty Elections

Mayor
Incumbent Mayor Jhoanna Corona-Villamor who assumed office as Mayor after the assassination of Mayor Antonio Halili on July 2, 2018, is running for provincial board member. She will be switching places with his father, incumbent Board Member Alfredo Corona.

Vice Mayor

City Council

Incumbents are expressed in italics.

By ticket

Team Corona-Tabing

Team Halili-Trinidad

Councilors

|-bgcolor=black
|colspan=25|

References

2019 Philippine local elections
May 2019 events in the Philippines
Elections in Tanauan
2019 elections in Calabarzon